Vadim Tatarov (born May 3, 1971) is a Moldovan former swimmer, who specialized in breaststroke events. He is a two-time Olympian (1996 and 2000), and a former Moldovan record holder in both 100 and 200 m breaststroke.

Tatarov made his Olympic debut, as a 25-year-old, at the 1996 Summer Olympics in Atlanta. He failed to reach the top 16 final in any of his individual events, finishing thirtieth in the 100 m breaststroke (1:04.87), and twenty-eighth in the 200 m breaststroke (2:21.34).

At the 2000 Summer Olympics in Sydney, Tatarov swam only in the 100 m breaststroke. He achieved a FINA B-standard entry time of 1:05.53 from the Russian Open Championships in Saint Petersburg. He established a Moldovan record of 1:04.12 to power past the entire field with an unexpected triumph in heat three, coming from an outside lane. Tatarov's first-place effort was not enough to put him through to the semifinals, as he placed thirty-sixth overall in the prelims.

References

1971 births
Living people
Moldovan male breaststroke swimmers
Olympic swimmers of Moldova
Swimmers at the 1996 Summer Olympics
Swimmers at the 2000 Summer Olympics
Sportspeople from Chișinău